The Annals of Emergency Medicine is a monthly peer-reviewed medical journal covering all aspects of emergency medicine care. It is the official journal of the American College of Emergency Physicians (ACEP) and is published on their behalf by Elsevier. The editor-in-chief is Donald M. Yealy (University of Pittsburgh). It was established in 1972 as the Journal of the American College of Emergency Physicians and obtained its current title in 1980.

Abstracting and indexing 
This journal is abstracted and indexed in:
 CINAHL
 Scopus
 Science Citation Index
 Current Contents/Clinical Medicine
 Index Medicus/MEDLINE/PubMed
According to the Journal Citation Reports, the journal has a 2021 impact factor of 6.762, ranking it first out of 32 journals in the category "Emergency Medicine". In 2009, the BioMedical & Life Sciences Division of the Special Libraries Association elected it to their list of the 100 most influential biomedical journals of the past century.

See also 
 List of medical journals

References

External links 
 

Publications established in 1972
Elsevier academic journals
Emergency medicine journals
Monthly journals
English-language journals
Academic journals associated with learned and professional societies